Major General Peter Maurice Arnison,  (born 21 October 1940) is a retired Australian Army officer who served as the 23rd Governor of Queensland, in office from July 1997 until July 2003. He graduated from the Royal Military College, Duntroon in 1962, and served as Land Commander Australia from 1994 until he retired from the Australian Army in 1996.

For the year prior to his appointment as governor, Arnison was the executive director of Allied Rubber Products, a manufacturing firm. He is a former Chancellor of Queensland University of Technology, and is Chairman of Panbio Limited, Chairman of the Centre for Military and Veterans' Health, Director of Energex Limited, Governor of the Queensland Community Foundation, and on the board of directors of the Australian Multicultural Foundation.

Personal
Arnison is married to Barbara.

Education, appointments, honours and awards

Bachelor of Economics
D Laws University of Queensland
D Univ Queensland University of Technology
D Univ Griffith University
D Letters University of Southern Queensland
D Univ Southern Cross University
Fellow of the Australian Institute of Company Directors
July 1977 National Medal
January 1992 Officer of the Order of Australia (AO)
1994 Land Commander Australia (LCAUST)
June 1996 Executive Director, Allied Rubber Products
July 1997 Queensland’s 23rd Governor
January 2001 Centenary Medal
March 2001 Companion of the Order of Australia (AC)
March 2002 Commander of the Royal Victorian Order (CVO)
December 2004 Non-executive Director, ENERGEX Limited
Chair, Network and Technical Committee, ENERGEX Limited 
Member, Audit and Compliance Committee, ENERGEX Limited 
Chancellor of Queensland University of Technology 
Chairman of The Centre for Military and Veterans’ Health 
Director of the Australian Multicultural Foundation
Chairman of Panbio Limited
Chairman, Communities Future Task Force
September 2009 re-elected Chancellor of Queensland University of Technology (QUT)  
January 2011 Appointed Chairman of the Flood Response Review Board in Brisbane

References

External links
 Biog at Queensland Museum Foundation
 Chancellor of Queensland University of Technology (QUT), homepage  with pictures:  

|-

|-

|-

1940 births
Australian Commanders of the Royal Victorian Order
Australian generals
Australian military personnel of the Vietnam War
Companions of the Order of Australia
Fellows of the Australian Institute of Company Directors
Governors of Queensland
Knights of Grace of the Order of St John
Living people
People from Lismore, New South Wales
Queensland University of Technology chancellors
Recipients of the Centenary Medal
Royal Military College, Duntroon graduates
University of Queensland alumni
Military personnel from New South Wales